Ovenbirds is the common name for the avian family Furnariidae, though  none of its members bear that name. The common name derives from the horneros, which itself derives from the Spanish word for oven, horno, used to describe the shape of their nests. The International Ornithological Committee (IOC) recognizes these 315 species in the family, distributed among three subfamilies and 70 genera. 

This list is presented according to the IOC taxonomic sequence and can also be sorted alphabetically by common name and binomial.

References

Ovenbird
Furnariidae